Olga Ševcova (born 26 November 1992) is a Latvian footballer who plays as a forward for ÍBV of the Úrvalsdeild kvenna and the Latvia women's national team. She has been named the Latvian Footballer of the Year on six occasions. Ševcova has played for clubs based in Lithuania, Estonia and Iceland, as well as in her native Latvia.

Club career

Ševcova's first club was JFC Skonto, where she played in the boys' youth teams under veteran coach Vladimirs Beļajevs. She joined Šitika Futbola Skolas in 2004, then moved on to FC Skonto/Cerība-46.vsk. where she played from 2007 until 2009.

Moving abroad, Ševcova then joined Lithuanian Women's A League champions Gintra Universitetas Šiauliai and participated in the club's 2009–10 UEFA Women's Champions League qualifying round campaign. From 2010 until 2014 Ševcova spent five seasons playing for Pärnu JK of the Estonian Naiste Meistriliiga.

In 2011 Ševcova was named Latvian Footballer of the Year for the first time, after five goals in 18 league games for Meistriliiga champions Pärnu and one against Peamount United in a 2011–12 UEFA Women's Champions League qualifying round defeat. She won the Latvian Footballer of the Year award for a second time in 2013.

Ševcova did not play in the 2015 season, as she was pregnant. Following the birth of her child, she returned to Latvian Women's League football with Rīgas FS in 2016. After helping Rīgas FS to a "double" in 2017, Ševcova was named Latvian Footballer of the Year for a third time. Continued good form saw her retain the award in 2018 and 2019. In 2019 she was one of several players to depart the dominant Rīgas FS club for newly-formed FK Dinamo Rīga, who then captured the Latvian Women's League title.

In January 2020 Ševcova transferred to the Icelandic Úrvalsdeild kvenna club ÍBV, along with her compatriots Elīza Spruntule and Karlīna Miksone. After a promising 2020 season in which she scored three goals in 16 appearances, Ševcova agreed a new one-year contract with ÍBV. In 2021 Ševcova was voted ÍBV's Player of the Year after she scored six goals in 16 appearances. She extended her contract again in December 2021.

International career

Ševcova has been capped for the Latvia women's national football team. She made her debut on 3 March 2011, in a 2–0 UEFA Women's Euro 2013 qualifying preliminary round defeat by Luxembourg in Strumica. She appeared for the team during the 2019 FIFA Women's World Cup qualifying cycle.

Ševcova became historic as the first ever Latvia women's national team player to score against Sweden or any top 10 ranked national team in the UEFA Women's Euro 2022 qualifying match played on 3 September 2019. Latvia was ranked 93 by FIFA and 43 by UEFA (fifth last of all who entered) at the time, in contrast to Sweden's sixth place.

Occasionally Ševcova has been unavailable for national team fixtures due to what the Latvian Football Federation (LFF) has described as: "ģimenes apstākļu", including in the return fixture with Sweden. For the same reason, she was one of several regular national team players who were unable to participate in the November 2021 FIFA Women's World Cup qualification match against England, in which a depleted Latvia team suffered a record 20–0 defeat.

Statistics

International goals
Scores and results list Latvia's goal tally first, score column indicates score after each Ševcova goal.

Style of play

An adaptable attacking player, Ševcova is capable of playing in most forward positions on the pitch.

Honours

Club
Skonto/Cerība
 Latvian Women's League: 2008, 2009

Gintra-Universitetas Šiauliai
 Lithuanian Women's A League: 2009
 Lithuanian Women's Cup: 2009

Pärnu JK
 Naiste Meistriliiga: 2010, 2011, 2012, 2013, 2014
 Estonian Women's Cup: 2010, 2011, 2012, 2014

Rīgas FS
 Latvian Women's League: 2016, 2017, 2018
 Latvian Women's Cup: 2016, 2017, 2018

Dinamo Rīga
 Latvian Women's League: 2019

International
Latvia
 Baltic Cup: 2017, 2018, 2019
 Aphrodite Women Cup: 2017

Individual
Latvian Footballer of the Year: 2011, 2013, 2017, 2018, 2019, 2022

Notes

References

External links
 
 
 
 
 
 

1992 births
Living people
Latvian women's footballers
Latvia women's international footballers
Women's association football midfielders
ÍBV women's football players
Úrvalsdeild kvenna (football) players
Latvian expatriate footballers
Expatriate women's footballers in Iceland
Latvian expatriate sportspeople in Iceland
Pärnu JK players
Latvian expatriate sportspeople in Estonia
Expatriate women's footballers in Estonia
Expatriate women's footballers in Lithuania
Latvian expatriate sportspeople in Lithuania
Gintra Universitetas players